Samba is a 1965 Brazilian-Spanish musical film directed by Rafael Gil and starring Sara Montiel, Marc Michel and Fosco Giachetti.

The film's sets were designed by the art directors Enrique Alarcón and Pierino Massenzi.

Cast
 Sara Montiel as Belén / Laura Monteiro  
 Marc Michel as Paulo  
 Fosco Giachetti as João Fernandes de Oliveira  
 Carlos Alberto as Assis  
 José Prada as Oliveira's lawyer  
 Zeni Pereira as Trinidad  
 Eliezer Gomes as Negro gangster  
 Antonio Pitanga as Paulo's friend  
 Álvaro Aguiar as White gangster  
 José Policena
 Antonia Marzullo as Belén's grandmother  
 Grande Otelo as Freitas  
 Arlindo Rodrigues as himself / Salgueiro art director 
 Leila Adiles
 Ernesto Alves
 Nestor de Montemar
 Moacyr Deriquém as Copacabana seducer  
 Wilson Grey as man in samba school committee  
 Milton Luiz
 Ciro Monteiro as President of Salgueiro Samba School  
 Maria Regina
 Leonardo Villar

References

Bibliography
 Aurora G. Morcillo. The Seduction of Modern Spain: The Female Body and the Francoist Body Politic. Bucknell University Press, 2010.

External links 

1965 films
Brazilian musical films
Spanish musical films
1965 musical films
1960s Spanish-language films
Films directed by Rafael Gil
Suevia Films films
1960s Spanish films